Nahmavis is genus of prehistoric birds related to Gruiformes and Charadriiformes. It is known from the  Green River Formation (Early Eocene) of Colorado, Wyoming, and Utah.

References

Prehistoric bird genera
Gruiformes
Charadriiformes
Eocene birds
Prehistoric birds of North America
Fossil taxa described in 2020